Abdul Mannan is a Bangladesh Awami League politician and the former Member of Parliament of Jhenaidah-4.

Birth and early life 
Abdul Mannan was born Jhenaidah District in 1952.

Career
Mannan was elected to parliament from Jhenaidah-4 as a Bangladesh Awami League candidate in 2008. He is the President of the Kaliganj Upazila unit of Bangladesh Awami League.

References

1952 births
Living people
People from Jhenaidah District
Awami League politicians
9th Jatiya Sangsad members